Mount Wise is a bare rock summit, the highest point (815 m) on Brown Peninsula, Antarctica. It was named by A.J. Heine of the McMurdo Ice Shelf Project, 1962–63, for K.C. Wise, a New Zealander who explored the peninsula while a member of the New Zealand Geological Survey Antarctic Expedition (NZGSAE), 1958–59.

Mountains of Victoria Land
Scott Coast